In mechanics, two or more springs are said to be in series when they are connected end-to-end or point to point, and it is said to be in parallel when they are connected  side-by-side; in both cases, so as to act as a single spring:

More generally, two or more springs are in series when any external stress applied to the ensemble gets applied to each spring without change of magnitude, and the amount strain (deformation) of the ensemble is the sum of the strains of the individual springs.  Conversely, they are said to be in parallel if the strain of the ensemble is their common strain, and the stress of the ensemble is the sum of their stresses.

Any combination of Hookean (linear-response) springs in series or parallel behaves like a single Hookean spring.  The formulas for combining their physical attributes are analogous to those that apply to capacitors connected in series or parallel in an electrical circuit.

Formulas

Equivalent spring
(The compliance  of a spring is the reciprocal  of its spring constant.)

Partition formulas

Derivations of spring formula (equivalent spring constant) 

{| class="toccolours collapsible collapsed" width="60%" style="text-align:left"
!Equivalent Spring Constant (Series)
|-
|When putting two springs in their equilibrium positions in series attached at the end to a block and then displacing it from that equilibrium, each of the springs will experience corresponding displacements x1 and x2 for a total displacement of x1 + x2. We will be looking for an equation for the force on the block that looks like:

The force that each spring experiences will have to be same, otherwise the springs would buckle. Moreover, this force will be the same as Fb. This means that

,
and similarly,
.
Substituting  and  into the latter equation, we find
.
Now remembering that , we arrive at

|}

{| class="toccolours collapsible collapsed" width="60%" style="text-align:left"
!Equivalent Spring Constant (Parallel)
|-
|Both springs are touching the block in this case, and whatever distance spring 1 is compressed has to be the same amount spring 2 is compressed.

The force on the block is then:
{|
|
|
|-
|
|
|}
So the force on the block is

Which is how we can define the equivalent spring constant as

|}

{| class="toccolours collapsible collapsed" width="60%" style="text-align:left"
!Compressed Distance
|-
|In the case where two springs are in parallel it is immediate that:
{|
|
|-
| and 
|}

|In the case where two springs are in series,  the force of the springs on each other are equal:
{|
|
|-
|
|}

From this we get a relationship between the compressed distances for the in series case:

|}

{| class="toccolours collapsible collapsed" width="60%" style="text-align:left"
!Energy Stored
|-
|For the series case, the ratio of energy stored in springs is:

but there is a relationship between x1 and x2 derived earlier, so we can plug that in:

For the parallel case,

because the compressed distance of the springs is the same, this simplifies to

|}

See also
 Truss
 Duality (mechanical engineering)

References

Springs (mechanical)